Unisan, officially the Municipality of Unisan,  is a 4th class municipality in the province of Quezon, Philippines. According to the 2020 census, it has a population of 25,448 people.

Etymology

The name of Unisan may have been derived from the Spanish verb unir, meaning "unite".  At that time inhabitants, which were composed of strangers from different parts of the island, were united and wanted to call the town Unisan, a corruption of the words union and unidos for the sake of euphony.

There is another, more plausible version which related that the name was derived from the Latin words uni-sancti, meaning "one saint" or "in honor of a saint", possibly referring to Friar Pedro Bautista, once a missionary to Unisan when this town was still Kalilayan and later canonized saint following his martyrdom while a missionary in Japan.  Uni-Sancti was made Unisan for short and to suit the Visayan and Caviteño tongues.

History
Unisan, originally called Kalilayan, is perhaps one of the oldest towns in the Philippines. As early as 1521, the town of Kalilayan was founded by Malayan settlers. All other towns in the country were established not earlier than 1565, when Spain formally occupied the Philippines as a colony. During the latter part of the 19th century, traditions said that the real founder of the town was a Malayan queen called of Ladya. Hence her title was "Queen of Kalilayan".

It is believed that the founding occurred in the Middle Ages when immigration of the Malayans to this country was still predominant. That was before the advent of Islam in the East Indies. This proven by the fact that no traces of Mohamed's Creed were found in that part of the Philippines when the Europeans arrived.

The name Kalilayan derived from the Tagalog root word lilay, referring to a kind of palm similar to buri with the smaller leaves in the size of anahaw leaves that grew once in abundance.

The town was designated as the first capital of the province of Kalilayan from the province's creation in 1591 to 1749, when the capital was transferred to the town of Tayabas. In February 1876, the town was separated from Pitogo and became an independent municipality. At the same time, it was renamed to Unisan which was derived from the Latin word uni-sancti, meaning "holy saint".

Geography

The municipality of Unisan is located on the central part of Quezon Province. It is bounded on the northern part by Atimonan, Quezon, on the south by the Tayabas Bay, on the western part by Agdangan and on the east by Gumaca and Pitogo. East of provincial Capital, the city of Lucena. It is accessible by land via Agdangan and Atimonan from Lucena City.

Barangays
Unisan is politically subdivided into 36 barangays. San Roque was formerly a sitio of barrio Tagumpay.

 Almacén
 Balagtás
 Balanacan
 Bulo Ibabâ
 Bulo Ilaya
 Bonifacio
 Burgos
 Caigdál
 General Luna
 Kalilayan Ibabâ
 Cabulihan Ibabâ
 Mairok Ibaba
 Kalilayan Ilaya
 Cabulihan Ilaya
 Mabini
 Mairok Ilayang
 Malvar
 Maputat
 Muliguin
 Pagaguasan
 Panaon Ibabâ
 Panaon Ilaya
 Pláridel
 F. De Jesús (Poblacion)
 R. Lapu-lapu (Poblacion)
 Raja Solimán (Poblacion)
 R. Magsaysay (Poblacion)
 Poctol
 Punta
 Rizal Ibabâ
 Rizal Ilaya
 San Roque
 Socorro
 Tagumpay
 Tubas
 Tubigan

Town proper
The town center (poblacion) consists of 4 barangays, R. Soliman, Ramon Magsaysay, Lapu-lapu and F. de Jesus. The heart of the town is the Catholic Church, comprising several blocks. The Unisan Central Elementary School is on the southeastern side of the church, while the Government Center is located at the back of the school which consists of Municipal Hall, Municipal Library, Fire Station, Police Station, Comelec Building and the Association of Barangay Captains (ABC) building.  Remedios Etorma Suarez Memorial Auditorium (RESMA), a well used spot for programs and events is on the same government center, while just across the auditorium is the Unisan National High School. The Tamesis Park, named after a prominent Unisanin, Florencio Tamesis, the first Filipino director of the Bureau of Forestry and considered by experts as the father of Philippine Forestry, is likewise located at the center of the town, just across the Church Basketball Court. The old municipal building, now a proud heritage building of Unisan, is on the southwest corner of the poblacion, near the Kalilayan River.

Climate

Demographics

Religion
The dominant religion in Unisan is Roman Catholic. Other religions present are:
United Church of Christ in the Philippines
Iglesia Ni Cristo
Jehovah's Witnesses
Born again

Saint Peter the Apostle Parish 
The foundation of Calilayan, the capital of the old province of Calilayan, by Friar de Plasencia and Friar de Oropesa started in 1578. The first church was made of bamboo and nipa. In 1589, Friar Pedro Bautista obtained the permission to rebuild it with wood. Friar Alonso Bañon administered Calilayan after 1595. Friar Jode de la Concepcion was Guardian of the convent in 1597. Friar Pedro de Alcazar administered the pueblo in 1600 and 1601. Friar Juan Manso was the religious minister in 1602. Friar Diego de la Magdalena, a member of the 6th Mission that arrived in the Philippines in 1594, also administered Calilayan. In 1605, Calilayan was ravaged by the Moros. Of the 9,000 residents, barely 1,000 survived the attack. The survivors took refuge near the Palsabangon River, where the missionaries, among whom was Friar Pedro de san Buenaventura, built a church, a convent and school buildings with bamboo and nipa. Friar Juan de Mérida administered Palsabangon in 1609. In 1913, because of the crocodiles, the people relocated to the sitio of Cabuyao, where Friar de Mérida built a church and a convent with wood and school buildings with bamboo and nipa. The people lived peacefully in Cabuyao until 1635, when the Moro attacked again. Some 800 survivors took refuge in the sitios of Atimonan and Minanucan (now barrion Talaba in Atimonan). Hence, for many years the town of Calilayan was totally abandoned. From 1620 onwards, a certain Gregorio Vicente united various families from Cabuyao with wandering descendants of those who had lived in Calilayan and Palsabangon, and he and all these people fixed there residence in the site of old Calilayan---the delta east of the Calilayan River---without recognizing any civil or religious authority. They lived there until 1637 when the Government saw the need to burn the town. Finally in 1874 or 1875, the town was established in the outskirts of the old Calilayan. During its early years, Unisan was administered by Fr. Marcos Tolentino, a secular priest, who In 1945, during the World War II, the church was partially destroyed; it was reconstructed by the Philippine Historical Commission in 1966.

Saint Roche Parish (Barangay Panaon) 
Established in 1962 by Father Ruben Profugo (later Bishop of the Diocese of Lucena), the Parokya ni San Roque was formerly a small church attached to the Parish of St Peter in the town proper and served by the priest/chaplains of the Holy Child Jesus Institute (Dominican Academy).  The parish comprises the barangays of Ibabang Bulo, Ilayang Bulo, Ibabang Mairok, Ilayang Mairok, Almacen, Bonifacio, Burgos, Ilayang Panaon, Ibabang Panaon, Tubigan, Plaridel, Ibabang Rizal, Ilayang Rizal, Socorro and Poctol. Most of the people are farmers. The church itself stands in the midst of rice fields. The priests who served Panaon either as parish priest or administrator include Fr. Antonio Salvo, Fr. Froilan Zalameda, Fr. Jose Dural, Fr. Dario Endiape, Fr. Quirino Macatangay, Fr. Jose Erlito Ebron, Fr. Alvin Cabungcal, Fr. Edwin Panergo,Fr. Isagani Reyes, Fr. Rolando Grecia, Fr. Benjamin Rhoda, Fr. Dennis Vargas and Fr. Claude Calvendra. Major Renovation of the church was done during the term of Fr. Roda.

Saint Peter the Apostle Parish and Saint Roche Parish are members of Roman Catholic Diocese of Lucena.

Economy

The economy of Unisan is sustained by fishing and agriculture.

Government

Mayors
List of former municipal mayors from 1941 onwards:
  Gerardo M. Maxino 1941–1945 
  Pedro Constantino, Jr (Appointed) 1945–1946
  Romualdo Vargas 1946–1955
  Joaquin M. Carillo 1955–1967
  Ramoncito C. Vera Cruz 1968–1972
  Arturo I. Constantino, Sr. 1972–1980; Re-elected in 1980 but died a few days after assuming office
  Ramoncito C. Vera Cruz (Elected Vice Mayor, became Mayor when Mayor Arturo Constantino died in March, 1980) 1980–1986
  Joselito V. Tolentino (OIC) 1986–1987; Elected 1988–1992
  Nonato E. Puache 1992–2001
  Cesar P. Alpay 2001–2004
  Nonato E. Puache 2004–2007
  Cesar P. Alpay 2007–2010
  Nonato E. Puache 2010–2019

  Ferdinand P. Adulta 2019–present

Appointed OIC:
  Rodolfo B. Matociños 12-01-1987 to 01-01-1988
  Renato V. Tolentino 01-01-1988 to 02-03-1988

Prominent Mayors in the pre-war era include, among others:
Atty. Francisco Deveza De Jesus (whom Barangay F. De Jesus was named after), 
Dr. Teodorico V. Valerio, 
Dionisio V. Valerio, and
Eulogio Fernandez

Several Mayors in the same era were surnamed Constantino and Isaac, two prominent names in the municipality

Vice Mayors

Municipal vice mayors: 1968 onwards

   Jorge B. Vargas - 1968–1972 
   Jose Redublo - 1972–1976
   Ramoncito C. Vera Cruz - 1976–1980
   Paulina E. Puache - 1980–1986
 (OIC) Editha M. Valerio 1986–1988 
  Nonato E. Puache 1988–1992
  Arturo C. Constantino, Jr. 1992–1995
  Cesar P. Alpay 1995–2001
  Arturo C. Constantino, Jr. 2001–2004
  Joselito V. Tolentino 2004–2007
  Arturo C. Constantino, Jr. 2007–2010
  Ferdinand P. Adulta 2010–2016
  Danilo C. Suarez, Jr. 2016–2019
  Sebastian M. Puache 2019–2022
  Meynard D. Lat 2022–present

Congressional district
Unisan belongs to the Quezon's 3rd district since 1987. The said congressional district also includes Agdangan, Buenavista, Catanauan, General Luna, Macalelon, Mulanay, Padre Burgos, Pitogo, San Andres, San Francisco and San Narciso.

It was previously represented as part of Quezon's 2nd district, Quezon's at-large district, and Region IV-A.

Culture

Events and festivals
Santo Niño Festival	- (3rd Sunday of January)
Cocolilay Festival - February 18
Dinilawang Manok Festival - February 18
Unisan Day - February 18
Holy Week-The Passion of Christ/Senakulo	- Lenten season
Flores De Mayo	- (Last Sunday of May)
Flores De Maria/Tapusan - (Last Day of May)	 
Feast of Saint Peter the Apostle (Town Fiesta)	- June 29
Unisan Family Day - November 30
Puto Bao Festival dito ang Original nyan!

During the month of February is the annual celebration of CocoLilay Festival, wherein the coconut tree and the Lilay Tree is the main attraction of the festivities. The festival is highlighted by a street dancing competition participated by the residents of different barangays, as well as by elementary and high school students.

In the later part of 2011, the Dinilawang Manok Festival was held in the town.  However, it was replaced again by CocoLilay Festival in the succeeding years to give importance to the town's history.

Tourism
 Liwasang Kagitingan
 Kalilayan Bridge
 Bonifacio Cave
 Mag-asawang Bato Beaches
 Casa Carrillo
 Casa De Jesus
 Casa Deveza
 Casa Tolentino
 Vargas' Mansion
 Tulay Buwaya
 Tulay Butiki
 Calilayan Cove Beach Park and Restaurant
 Unisan Sands Beach Resort
 Glampbox - Malatandang Beach Glamping
 Punta Beach Resort
 Mount Kugunan Almacen
 Rizal Dam
 Rizal Mini Falls
 Brgy Burgos Waterfalls
 The Original Malatandang Beach before Calilayan Cove
 Pantalan Unisan Baywalk

Education

Elementary schools

Secondary
Caigdal National High School
Dominican Academy, formerly Holy Child Jesus Institute
Leonarda Deveza Vera Cruz National High School, formerly Panaon National High School and Panaon Barangay High School
Unisan Integrated High School, formerly Unisan Unisan National High School / Municipal High School

Tertiary
Polytechnic University of the Philippines (Unisan Campus)

Notable personalities

Danilo E. Suarez  - Provincial Governor of Quezon, 2019 to present l Representative of the 3rd District of Quezon in the House of Representatives of the Philippines, 1992–2001, 2004–2013, 2016 - 2019
David "Jay-jay" Suarez   - Provincial Governor of Quezon, 2010 -2019
Louie Alas - Multi-titled Filipino basketball coach. He is the former head coach of the Letran Knights in the National Collegiate Athletic Association, former head coach of the Manila Metrostars in the now defunct Metropolitan Basketball League, former head coach of two other teams in the PBA and at present, assistant coach of the Alaska team, also in the PBA
Pepe Alas - Historian.

References

External links

Unisan Profile at PhilAtlas.com
[ Philippine Standard Geographic Code]
Philippine Census Information
Local Governance Performance Management System

Municipalities of Quezon